Several provincial agencies and crown corporations regulate sales of Cannabis in Canada, following national legalization in 2018 under the Cannabis Act.

Alberta Gaming, Liquor and Cannabis Commission
British Columbia Liquor and Cannabis Regulation Branch
New Brunswick Liquor Corporation
Newfoundland and Labrador Liquor Corporation
Northwest Territories Liquor Commission
Nova Scotia Liquor Corporation
Nunavut Liquor and Cannabis Commission
Alcohol and Gaming Commission of Ontario
Saskatchewan Liquor and Gaming Authority

See also
List of United States cannabis regulatory agencies
Mexican Cannabis Institute

Regulatory agencies
Canada
Canada regulatory agencies